Below is the complete filmography of the Pakistani actor Mustafa Qureshi.

1950s-1960s

1970s

1980s

1990s

2000s

2010s

Television

External links 
Mustafa Qureshi Filmography with Online Movies
Karachi cinemas' report on Mustafa Qureshi films

Pakistani film-related lists
Qureshi, Mustafa
Qureshi, Mustafa